Malik Ahmad Karim Qaswar Langrial is a Pakistani politician who was a Member of the Provincial Assembly of the Punjab, from May 2013 to May 2018.

Early life and education
He was born on 30 October 1971 in Muzaffargarh.

He graduated in law from Bahauddin Zakariya University in 1991.

Political career
He was elected to the Provincial Assembly of the Punjab as a candidate of Pakistan Muslim League (Q) (PML-Q) from Constituency PP-257 (Muzaffargarh-VII) in 2002 Pakistani general election. He received 20643 votes and defeated Nawabzada Muhammad Ahmad Khan.

He was elected to the Provincial Assembly of the Punjab as a candidate of Pakistan Muslim League (Nawaz) from Constituency PP-257 (Muzaffargarh-VII) in 2013 Pakistani general election.

In December 2013, he was appointed as Parliamentary Secretary for planning & development.

He ran for the seat of the National Assembly of the Pakistan as an independent candidate from Constituency NA-184 (Muzaffargarh-IV) in 2018 Pakistani general election, but was unsuccessful. He received 41753 votes and lost the seat to Iftikhar Ahmed Khan Babar, a candidate of Pakistan Peoples Party (PPP).

References

Living people
Punjab MPAs 2013–2018
1971 births
Pakistan Muslim League (N) politicians
People from Muzaffargarh
People from Muzaffargarh District
Politicians from Muzaffargarh